Baha ud-din Toukan was a Jordanian Ambassador.

Career
Toukan joined the Arab Legion and became secretary to the Commanding Officer in 1932. Five years later, he was transferred to Court of Abdullah I of Jordan, the Amir of Emirate of Transjordan. In 1941, he was employed in Jordan as clerk in the Arab Legion and official in the Department of Education unit seconded to the BBC as an Arabic announcer. BBC hired him for their London office the following year.

In 1944, he returned to Jordan. From April 1945 to August 1945, he was an Income tax Assesor of the Emirate of Transjordan. During the two-month negotiations in England in early 1946 for the Treaty of London, he was acting secretary to the Prime Minister Samir al-Rifai. He was then Mutasarrıf of the Balqa Governorate until 1947, when he became the Transjordan Consul-General in Jerusalem.

In 1948, he began a period as a Jordanian Ambassador, first in Beirut, Lebanon. He was then in Cairo, Egypt from 1948 to 1951, when he was assigned to Ankara Turkey until 1954. The following two years, he was Minister of State of foreign affairs (Under-Secretary, Ministry of Foreign Affairs).

Beginning , he was assigned as Permanent Representative to the United Nations in New York. He made a statement during a General Assembly session that disputed the position of the Jordanian government, and it was reported that the government dismissed him shortly after that, on 1 September 1958. This episode came about during a tense period following an attempt to overthrow King Hussein in April and Toukan's protest against Abdel Monem Rifia, having been sent to lead the General Assembly discussions for Jordan at the U.N. Rather than being asked to continue to lead the delegation, Toukan was asked to return to Jordan. He held that position, though, until .

From 1962 to  he was Minister of State of foreign affairs (Under-Secretary, Ministry of Foreign Affairs). From  to 1971 he was head the mission of the Arab League en Rome.

See also
 Alia Al-Hussein, Toukan's daughter
 Tuqan family

Notes

References

1910 births
1971 deaths
Tuqan family
Ambassadors of Jordan to Lebanon
Ambassadors of Jordan to Egypt
Ambassadors of Jordan to the United Kingdom
Ambassadors of Jordan to Turkey
Permanent Representatives of Jordan to the United Nations